Vishal Film Factory is an Indian film production, distribution and music company established by actor Vishal in 2013. Based in Chennai, it  mainly produces and distributes Tamil films. It releases music on V-Music.

History 
Vishal Film Factory first produced the film Pandiya Naadu (2013) it was directed by Suseenthiran. the film features Vishal and Lakshmi Menon in the lead roles, while Bharathiraja, Soori, Vikranth, and Sharath Lohitashwa play other pivotal roles.The film was released in Hindi,and remade in Kannada.Pandiya Naadu (2013) film released more than 350+ screens in Tamil Nadu , while overseas it released in 70 screens adding up to 1000+ screens worldwide. Film collected first day opening day collection grossed ₹7.14 crore .The film received positive reviews from critics.Also the film won SIIMA Best Debutant Producer award

Filmography 

As producer

As distributor

Film soundtracks released

References

External links 

2013 establishments in Tamil Nadu
Film production companies based in Chennai
Indian film studios